Arnaldo Alonso (born 18 December 1979) is a Paraguayan footballer who played for clubs including San Martín de San Juan of the Primera B Nacional in Argentina.

References
 

1979 births
Living people
Paraguayan footballers
Paraguayan expatriate footballers
12 de Octubre Football Club players
Club Sol de América footballers
Club Olimpia footballers
Club Universitario de Deportes footballers
San Martín de San Juan footballers
Deportivo Pasto footballers
Expatriate footballers in Peru
Expatriate footballers in Colombia
Expatriate footballers in Argentina
Association football midfielders